John Bate may refer to:

 John Bate (theologian) (died 1429), English or Welsh theologian and philosopher
 John Bate (politician), 1959 and 1962 Manitoba general election 
 John Bate (railway engineer), former chief engineer of the Talyllyn Railway

See also
John Bate Cardale (1802–1877), English religious leader
John Bates (disambiguation)